Tarrango is a small settlement in the Mallee region of Victoria, Australia. It is approximately 460 km northwest of Melbourne and is close to the Murray-Sunset National Park

Towns in Victoria (Australia)